Diego Armando Calderón Espinoza (born October 26, 1986 in Quito) is an Ecuadorian footballer who currently plays for Wadi Degla SC in Egypt. He was part of the squad who won the 2008 Copa Libertadores with Liga de Quito.

Club career
Calderón participated in L.D.U. Quito's campaign in the Copa Libertadores 2008. He made great defensive displays against many of Liga's opponents. However, he sustained an injury during the Round of 16 and was replaced by Renán Calle for the rest of the tournament. His team became the first Ecuadorian team to win the Copa Libertadores.

Calderón again became a regular starter during Liga's campaign in the 2008 FIFA Club World Cup. He played both games against Pachuca and Manchester United. Although Liga was able to defeat Pachuca 2-0 in the semifinals, they lost the final to Manchester United, 1-0. He and the rest of his team had a good, solid performance throughout the tournament. He was loaned to the Colorado Rapids in advance of the 2013 season, although he missed much of the season following knee surgery.

Honors
L.D.U. Quito
Serie A (3): 2005 Apertura, 2007, 2010
Copa Libertadores (1): 2008
Copa Sudamericana (1): 2009
Recopa Sudamericana (2): 2009, 2010

Deportivo Azogues
Serie B (1): 2006 E1

References

External links

Player's card on FEF's website 

1986 births
Living people
Footballers from Quito
Ecuadorian footballers
Ecuador international footballers
2011 Copa América players
L.D.U. Quito footballers
Deportivo Azogues footballers
Colorado Rapids players
Barcelona S.C. footballers
Club Atlético Zacatepec players
C.D. Cuenca footballers
S.D. Aucas footballers
Ecuadorian Serie A players
Major League Soccer players
Ecuadorian expatriate footballers
Expatriate soccer players in the United States
Expatriate footballers in Mexico
Ecuadorian expatriate sportspeople in the United States
Ecuadorian expatriate sportspeople in Mexico
Association football defenders